Katy Mills is a shopping mall in Katy, Texas, within the Houston metropolitan area, and it is one of the tourist destinations in Houston. It was developed by The Mills Corporation and is now managed by Simon Property Group, who owns 62.5% of it. The mall opened on October 28, 1999 and hosted a variety of over 174 stores. Katy Mills has about 1.3 million square feet (0.12 km2) of retail space.

Shopping center
The mall is built with a "racetrack" design and one complete pass around the mall on Katy Mills Cir.

Popular department stores and anchors including AMC Theatres, Bass Pro Shops Outdoor World, Books-A-Million, Burlington Coat Factory, H&M, XXI Forever, Marshalls, Off Broadway Shoes, Off Fifth Saks Fifth Avenue, Old Navy, The Cheesecake Factory, Rainforest Cafe, Restoration Hardware Outlet, Ross Dress for Less, Sun and Ski Sports, and Tilt Studio, some of which relocated from Sealy Outlet Center, which was supplanted by Katy Mills due to its distance from nearby Sealy. It has a food court, a carousel, and a Disney Junior themed play area. Outside, various restaurants such as Red Lobster, and Los Cucos surround the mall. There is also an AMC Theatres with 20 theater rooms.

The shopping mall is located within Fort Bend County, Texas, although a future anchor space and a small portion of the parking lot is located in neighboring Harris County.

History

Background (1997-1999)
In 1997, a property development company based in Arlington, Virginia, known as The Mills Corporation had negotiations to build a mall in Katy, Texas. They said that this would be their second mall they would build in Texas, after Grapevine Mills in Grapevine, Texas, which opened later the same year. The 727 acre site was owned by Interfin Corporation. It was located near Interstate 10 and the Grand Parkway. The site, owned by Interfin was located near Mason Road. Eventually, The Mills leased the land from Dallas-based American Realty Trust. The site from American Realty Trust, at the size of 500 acres, was located near Pin Oak Road. Grapevine Mills opened in October of 1997, and a month later, it was followed by Arizona Mills in Tempe, Arizona.

The Mills later purchased the 500 acre site in February 1998 and construction began on the mall, along with German-based Kan Am, RTKL Associates, Greg Rose Design, JK Design Group, Creative Artisans Group, Penwal, Texas Bomanite, and the American Institute of Steel Construction. This required some extreme measures, such as Kingsland Boulevard extending for more roads to connect to the street the mall would sit, Katy Mills Circle, that way it can also pass through Pin Oak Road.

The Mills pitched several anchors to open in the mall, such as AMC Theater, Virgin Megastore, Off Rodeo Drive Beverly Hills, Boot Town, Books-A-Million, Rainforest Cafe, Marshalls, Bass Pro Shops Outdoor World, Old Navy and GameWorks. In early 1999, plans changed for the opening of Katy Mills, as GameWorks and Virgin Megastore would not open, and instead Jillian’s and F.Y.E. (For Your Entertainment) would open. They also announced that they would open Bed Bath and Beyond, Burlington Coat Factory, and for the first time ever, a Benetton Sportsystem store. This marks the first time Benetton goes in the retail business. They also announced that they would not open Marshalls in the mall, and would instead open Funkyard. A couple months later, Katy Mills announced that they would open OFF 5TH Saks Fifth Avenue Outlet and Sun & Ski Sports, and as the opening drew closer, Off Rodeo Drive Beverly Hills and Boot Town would not open and instead would open Starflight Cafe and “Old West Warehouse”. The Mills also pitched some non-anchor stores, such as the now-defunct NASCAR Silicon Motor Speedway, Big Dog Sportswear, Skechers USA, Bose Factory Store, Brooks Brothers Factory Store, Carter's for Kids, Kenneth Cole New York, the Official Dallas Cowboys Pro Shop, Mikasa Factory Store, and Samsonite.

Following all of the negotiations that happened during construction of the mall, it was time for the design. Photos during the indoor construction phase can be seen here. These photos were taken by Creative Artisans Group, and were hosted on Flickr. Creative Artisans Group was responsible for painting the designs in the mall. RTKL, Greg Rose Design, and the American Institute of Steel Construction helped with the structures, JK Design Group helped with the lighting, and Texas Bomanite helped with the crystal flooring. Around the time of indoor construction, Concord Mills was opening in Concord, North Carolina, in September of 1999.

Construction completed in October of 1999 and the mall was ready to open. The Mills promoted the mall by releasing various print ads in newspapers, as well as two television commercials, but only one has been found. It shows a father putting grease on a wild pig and the family gets ready to play with it. That is until the pig runs wild and starts making a mess, breaking things around the house, causing the family to go on a wild pig chase. The advertising motto for the mall was “Shop Together, Eat Together, Play Together.” This motto was to signify people that Katy Mills is a place for shopping, dining, and entertainment. Some say it’s a combination of shopping and entertainment, or, as it’s commonly referred to as “shoppertainment.”

The Mills era (1999-2006)
Katy Mills mall opened at 8:00 AM CDT, on Thursday, October 28th, 1999 and a ribbon-cutting ceremony was held at 9:30. The mall opened its stores for the first time at 10:00 AM. All the stores opened as planned.

Katy Mills’s design of the mall was different than a typical mall. Like with most malls from The Mills, the mall was themed around a school, because most of the decor looked like they were made out of construction paper. The main mascots of Katy Mills were stars, since Texas was “The Lone Star State”. It had fun patterns in its exterior and had 50-foot tall entrance features. The mall had a racetrack design and was split into six neighborhoods, each with its own combination of colors, sculptures, patterns, sounds and lighting. The food court in the center named “Katy Field Day” was themed around an athletic field, because of the scoreboard and the decorations that feature the stars playing sports games. The food court is about the size of a typical athletic field. The food court had 8 restaurants (also featuring Cinnabon and Carvel) and was cornered by Moe’s Grill and Bar (not to be confused with Moe’s Southwest Grill) & Johnny Rockets. According to the old version of the Katy Mills website, they said that the mall was “the newest star in Texas”, and “With Katy Mills in the area, shopping in Texas will never be the same again.” The mall also had several TVs hanging from the ceiling of the mall that played music videos and other content to keep shoppers informed, persuaded, and entertained.

Popular stores from around this time were OFF 5TH Saks Fifth Avenue Outlet, Brooks Brothers Factory Store, Mikasa Factory Store, Charlotte Russe Outlet, Bose Factory Store, Kenneth Cole New York, Harold Powell Outlet, Old West Warehouse, Bed Bath and Beyond, among others. Famous eateries include Rainforest Cafe, Jillian’s, Johnny Rockets, Moe’s Grill and Bar, Starbucks, restaurants in the Food Court, among others. Various entertainment venues include Bass Pro Shops Outdoor World, Sun & Ski Sports, F.Y.E. (For Your Entertainment), AMC Theater, NASCAR Silicon Motor Speedway, among others.

This mall, along with Concord Mills, was one of the two first malls to have a separate store for The Woman’s Athlete’s Foot.

The first 5,000 shoppers that came to the mall earned one of ten $1,000 shopping sprees and other great prizes. Various celebrities came to visit the mall, such as the Miss Texas pageant, former WNBA player Tina Thompson and former NFL defense tackler Ray Childress. One hour before the ribbon-cutting ceremony and 30 minutes after the mall opened, the Aggie Wranglers performed in the Food Court at 8:30 AM. Following the opening of the stores, the Houston Firefighters had a “Men of the Millennium” fashion show. People were eligible to register to win a 1999 Chrysler Sebring Convertible. At 7:30 PM, Joyce Cooling had a concert in the Food Court. The concert was sponsored by Houston radio station, KODA. When the mall opened, it had 91.2% occupancy. Photos of the opening night can be found here, taken by Darel Rex Finley.

Following the grand opening of the mall, there were several activities in the mall. Rhett Akins had a concert on October 30. The High Impact Squad performed in the Food Court on the same day. The mall hosted a giveaway to a ski trip to Steamboat, Colorado. Kevin and Brian Black had a concert on October 31. Paul Taylor had a concert on November 4. Ron Brown had a concert on November 11. People were eligible to win a trip for two people to either a Dallas Cowboys or a Green Bay Packers game on November 13. Craig Chaquico had a concert on November 18.

One of the most famous activities the mall hosted was a visit with Tommy Pickles and Chuckie Finster from the Nickelodeon TV series, Rugrats. It was hosted from November 20 through November 21.

In 2000, Katy Mills opened more stores, such as Polo Ralph Lauren, which replaced EUROKIDS Designer Boutique and the planned Marshalls, which replaced Funkyard. Verizon was also opened. Also, Benetton Sportsystem somehow disappeared from the mall. Also, The Woman’s Athlete’s Foot became The Athlete’s Foot for Her.

The mall wanted to be part of the MATCH Program (Mills Access to Training and Career Help) by establishing the “Katy Mills Milers” program, where when people walk a full mile around Katy Mills, they can earn great prizes for how many miles they walked.

In 2001, Reebok, RadioShack, and Hugo Boss opened in the mall. In the same year, Verizon got replaced by Cingular Wireless, forcing Verizon to relocate into a kiosk in Neighborhood 6. NASCAR Silicon Motor Speedway permanently closed around the time, so no more rides can be taken.

In 2002, Two new lingerie stores opened up, which are Frederick’s of Hollywood and 5-7-9. The mall also debuted BCBG Max Azria. Also, because VoiceStream Wireless became T-Mobile US, Katy Mills changed VoiceStream to T-Mobile. Hugo Boss and rue21 also closed that same year. Katy Mills opened Midnight Rodeo in the former space of Starflight Cafe.

In 2003 new stores debuted, such as Diamonds and More Diamond Outlet, Nextel Wireless, Suit Warehouse, Nine West and Perfumes Unlimited. BCBG Max Azria was also closed. Also, NASCAR Silicon Motor Speedway returned, this time it’s known as Checkered Flag Lightning. Similarly, Stop ‘n’ Save Software became EB Games, and Select Comfort became Sleep Number.

In 2004, Katy Mills debuted a brand new store. By merging Harold Powell Outlet with Larry’s Shoes Authentic Outlet, Katy Mills debuted Last Call! Clearance Center by Neiman Marcus. Although the store was bigger than Books-A-Million, which is an anchor, the Katy Mills map of 2004 shows that Neiman Marcus has the same color as non-anchor stores, making people believe that Last Call isn’t even an anchor. This issue was fixed in later mall maps released by Simon. This also marked the debut of Go! Calendars Games & Toys and Limited Too. Suit Warehouse was relocated in front of Old West Warehouse. Jillian’s filed for Chapter 11 bankruptcy, which led to Jillian’s being acquired by Dave & Buster's, causing this location to close.

In 2005, Bui-Yah-Kah relocated in Neighborhood 7, and Samsonite relocated to a new space near Neighborhood 4. Not only that, but they also rebranded Nextel Wireless to Sprint, as a result of Sprint’s merger with Nextel. It also marked the debut of Famous Footwear, and Steve and Barry’s University Sportswear. The store was formerly located in Neighborhood 1 before relocating to Neighborhood 7 as an anchor store, replacing Jillian’s. Perry Ellis, Just Sports and Auntie Anne’s Pretzel Factory were also closed. A rock climbing wall and a carousel were added to the food court. Checkered Flag Lightning was also permanently closed, which means that no more rides can be taken. This is another large vacancy the mall left along with Benetton Sportsystem, which remained vacant after it closed before becoming XXI Forever. The Athlete’s Foot for Her moved to the store’s main space in Neighborhood 2, eventually making its former space become BonWorth. Cold Stone Creamery became Marble Slab Creamery. For the halloween season, Spirit Halloween opened in the former space of Samsonite. For the holiday season, Calendar Club opened in the former space of Just Sports.

In 2006, famous designer stores started appearing in Katy Mills mall. These stores included J. Crew, Anne Klein, Florsheim, Lucky Brand Jeans, Lane Bryant, Foot Locker, American Eagle Outfitters, Aéropostale, and more. Brooks Brothers had to be closed to make room for J. Crew.

Simon acquisition era (2006-2013)
In early 2006, shortly before the opening of these stores, shoppers noticed that the TV screens have disappeared, making many people think that The Mills is shutting down and closing the mall. But then, in mid 2006, Long-time partner and rival Simon Property Group announced that they would be acquiring the mall. This would be one of the first malls from The Mills to be acquired by Simon. The last addition to the mall from the Mills was a children’s play area near the movie theater. The play area was sponsored by Team Certified Suzuki.

The following year in 2007, Simon acquired The Mills Corporation, which led to Simon taking full control of the mall. New stores opened up, such as New York & Company, Juicy Couture, Oakley Vault, Ecko and Zumiez. Mikasa Factory Store, Big Dog Sportswear, and Midnight Rodeo closed, and EB Games became GameStop. Levi’s/Dockers Outlet Store relocated to Bui-Yah-Kah in Neighborhood 7, causing Bui-Yah-Kah to relocate to the former space of Samsonite in Neighborhood 5. Claire’s and Icing also have swapped places, and Cingular Wireless became AT&T, due to the same reasons with Sprint and T-Mobile.

2008 brought some much needed sanity. Two new stores, Circuit City “The City” (which replaced Midnight Rodeo) and Nike Factory Outlet opened in the mall. This caused Suit Warehouse to relocate near Reebok. Also, there were more stores, such as Kay Jewelers and Gymboree. Lucky Brand Jeans was also closed and became Gaughty Girlz, generating backlash from many people. A bungee trampoline was also added to the movie theater courtyard.

In 2009, Circuit City filed for Chapter 11 bankruptcy, causing its locations to close, including this one. Steve and Barry’s suffered a similar fate, and has also been closed. Old West Warehouse was also closed, too. Also, an expansion was made in Neighborhood 3, merging Liz Claiborne and Bennetton to become XXI Forever. They also kept Juicy Couture from Liz Claiborne. Also, more stores opened up, such as Dickies, Papaya, Victoria’s Secret, PINK, Calvin Klein, and U.S. Polo Association. Kirkland’s had to be closed to make room for Papaya. RadioShack was relocated to make room for Victoria’s Secret. Similarly, The Athlete’s Foot permanently closed to make room for PINK. Anne Klein was also closed and was replaced with another BCBGMAXAZRIA Final Cut. Gaughty Girlz and Sleep Number were also closed. Limited Too also became Justice. For a brief moment, Katy Mills had a Halloween exhibit called “Katy Haunted House - Texas Terror”.

In 2010, things have gotten out of hand. The original restaurants that cornered the Katy Field Day Food Court (Moe’s Grill and Bar & Johnny Rockets) closed, as well as Go! Calendars Games & Toys, BCBGMAXAZRIA Final Cut, Icing, and Starbucks. Newer stores opened up, such as Off Broadway Shoes, Tommy Bahama’s, DKNY, Coach and A’Gaci. Lane Bryant was relocated to make room for A’Gaci. Windsor, originally located next to Pacific Sunwear Outlet has been relocated next to Famous Footwear. Katy Mills added a hamster ball activity in the Food Court.

The following year in 2011, some designs in the mall have been removed, making many people think that someday, Simon will renovate the mall. Many people say this is the worst time for the mall not only because these designs are gone, but because most of the original restaurants permanently closed. (Except Burger King.) The new restaurants that opened include Villa, GreatWraps, and Charley’s Grilled Subs. New stores have opened. Janie and Jack, Yankee Candle, Clarks, Express, DC Shoes, and Robert Wayne Footwear were new to the mall. Wilson’s Leather was relocated near Marshalls in order to make room for Aldo. Verizon’s kiosk was also relocated. Near the end of the year, one of the original anchors in the mall, F.Y.E. permanently closed and became Tilt Studio. The Official Dallas Cowboys Pro Shop was also closed. This marked the return of Perry Ellis.

In 2012, New stores were opened, such as Subway, Abercrombie & Fitch, and Fanzz. Dickies was also closed. To make room for Abercrombie & Fitch, Rack Room Shoes and Florsheim were relocated. Several more restaurants opened, such as Nestlé Toll House Café and Smoothie King.

Don Massey era (2013-2018)
In 2013, a new general manager was announced. This general manager would replace Mace Hirt, who was the general manager of the mall since it opened. The new general manager, named Don Massey would be in charge of the mall.

In the same year, new stores opened, such as Ross Dress for Less opening in the former space of Circuit City. More stores such as Crocs, Michael Kors, Jumpstreet and Segway Outback opened. Samsonite was relocated to Neighborhood 4, Bui-Yah-Kah was also relocated yet again, Famous Footwear was relocated next to Payless ShoeSource, and Aéropostale was relocated next to Pacific Sunwear Outlet, making its old location become P.S. by Aéropostale. Suit Warehouse and Windsor were also closed. This marked the return of rue21.

In 2014, Old Navy relocated to the former spaces of Famous Footwear and Mikasa, while its old space becomes H&M. Perry Ellis once again closed, making it become Vera Bradley Outlet. This was only for a short time, because it was replaced with the new location for Wilson’s Leather. Two new shoe stores opened up, such as Shoe Palace and Steve Madden. Fanzz was also relocated to the former space of 5-7-9, and Frederick’s of Hollywood permanently closed. Sanrio, Rocky Mountain Chocolate Factory, RadioShack, and Ecko also closed too.

When Simon unveiled a new logo in 2014, the City of Katy started discussing renovations of the mall. Following the beginning of the discussions, Katy Mills removed more of its interior decor. 

From 2015 to 2016, a complicated series of relocations of stores have happened. It all started when Lane Bryant relocated to Neighborhood 1, and G.H. Bass & Co. relocated to Neighborhood 7 between Pacific Sunwear and Hot Topic. Shortly after Lane Bryant’s reopening, Bass relocated yet again to the former space occupied by Lane Bryant. Following the relocation of Bass, Katy Mills tried their first attempt to bring back Go! Calendars Games & Toys in the former space of Bass, but it closed in 2016. Aside from these events that happened, newer stores opened, such as Buckle, Fossil, Kate Spade New York, Jared Vault, Converse and Adidas. Charley’s Grilled Subs also became Charleys Philly Steaks, and Charlotte Russe Outlet became LemonPOP. Suit Warehouse also returned to the mall, and to this day, it will remain.

In 2016, things have gotten out of hand, this time for the worse. The stars in the mall were permanently removed from the mall. This was very sad for most shoppers. Aside, The LemonPOP name gained too much backlash, which eventually led to Charlotte Russe coming back, generating happiness for many people. Also, another series of relocations occurred. This photo shows Hot Topic located near Ross Dress for Less, meaning that at the time of the photo was taken, Hot Topic was renovating its former location in Neighborhood 7, making an expansion, causing three stores to become two. After the end of renovation, Hot Topic was ready to reopen in that space, as well as Foot Locker relocating to the space between Hot Topic and Pacific Sunwear, leaving room for Build-A-Bear Workshop. This closed Go! Calendars Games & Toys again. Similarly, Jared Vault relocated to being one of the corners of the Food Court, replacing DC Shoes. Kenneth Cole, Bed Bath & Beyond and P.S. by Aéropostale permanently closed. The rock wall and the hamster ball activity was also removed, but only the carousel was kept. Also, another bungee trampoline was added to the Food Court.

In 2017, DR34M Home Rug and Design briefly opened over Bed Bath & Beyond. Also, newer stores opened up, such as Kipling, Cotton On and Fashion Q. When the end of 2017 neared, Charlotte Russe permanently closed and became Under Armour Factory House, and Reebok was relocated to the former space of Kenneth Cole. Also, Restoration Hardware opened its store in the mall in October 2017.

Mall renovation (2018-2019)
On January 2018, James Ross was the new general manager for Katy Mills mall. After long negotiations, James was ready to take on the project and renovate Katy Mills mall.

The announcement was held on March 8, 2018. They said that they would renovate Katy Mills mall. The new features in the mall were replacing the colorful palette with a grayscale palette, new LED lighting, redesigning the tile floor design, redesigning the seating areas, new signage, a completely redesigned Food Court, and a Disney Junior Play Zone. The renovation officially started after the first tiles of the flooring of the mall were broken.

Construction on the renovation started the following month, During the renovation, many new stores opened up, such as Five Below and Go! Calendars Games & Toys. Actually, this was Katy Mills’ second attempt to reintroduce Go! Calendars Games & Toys, as it got replaced by Lavelier in 2019. Many stores also relocated, such as Nautica relocating near Marshalls, Michael Kors relocating to the former space of Nautica, Reebok relocating next to Express, and PINK relocating to Bose Factory Store, therefore closing Bose, permanently. This eventually made Victoria’s Secret become one large store. Nine West entered bankruptcy, so it closed.

The interior renovation was officially completed in 2019. Aside from the completion of the renovation, more stores opened up, such as Helzberg Diamonds, BoxLunch, and Champs Sports. It also marked the return of Windsor and Dickies. Three companies that suffered from bankruptcy closed, which are Gymboree, Payless and DressBarn. Jumpstreet and Segway Outback were also closed. The latter two were due to “circumstances beyond our control”. Kay Jewelers and Fashion Q was also closed. Following the completion of the interior, it was time to renovate the exterior. Most of the exterior has been worked on, but some parts were never finished, such as the exterior of the movie theater.

COVID-19 pandemic (2019-present)
Katy Mills briefly closed for shopping, and was only available for mall walkers. Simon added special signage to keep shoppers safe. This was a hard time for Katy Mills, as most of its original stores are closing, such as Lane Bryant, Justice, New York and Company, Wilson’s Leather, Bass, Motherhood Maternity, A’Gaci, Naturalizer, Great American Cookies and worst of all, Last Call. Sprint was merged into T-Mobile, causing Sprint to become another T-Mobile location. Immediately after A’Gaci closed, it became Fashion Q again, but was ultimately replaced with Madrag, causing Fashion Q to relocate to the former space of DressBarn. When Fashion Q would become Crazy Boss, the Justice store space remained vacant, eventually finding Fashion Q a new, permanent home. This time, it will stay.

Katy Mills reopened for shopping in 2021, but some of its stores permanently closed, such as Van Heusen and Robert Wayne Footwear. The closure of Van Heusen was depressing for most shoppers. This also marked the return of F.Y.E., but instead of being a music/video seller, it is instead similar to the now-defunct ThinkGeek stores, as it sells novelty items based on video games. Another store that returned was Go! Calendars Games & Toys, but this was only Katy Mills third attempt to reintroduce the store, as it was quickly replaced with NextLevel.

2022 saw the closure of Kipling and MasterCuts. Eventually, Katy Mills debuted lots of new stores, such as The Cheesecake Factory, Pandora, Aerie, Miniso, Dig World, and Lee Wrangler. This also marked the return of Great American Cookies and Lucky Brand Jeans. Instead of re-opening in its original space (which is currently occupied by Coach), Lucky Brand Jeans opened in the space adjacent to Coach, between Coach and Samsonite. Due to the chain becoming defunct by the end of 2022, Nestlé Toll House Café was replaced by Great American Cookies, thus making a comeback to Katy Mills.

Events

Concerts

Meet-ups

Fashion shows

Ceremonies

References

External links
 

Shopping malls in Greater Houston
Buildings and structures in Fort Bend County, Texas
Shopping malls established in 1999
Outlet malls in the United States
Simon Property Group
Tourist attractions in Fort Bend County, Texas
1999 establishments in Texas